Pedro Pérez Conde (born 26 July 1988) is a Spanish professional footballer who plays for Super League Greece club PAS Giannina F.C. as a striker.

Club career

Córdoba
Born in Villafranca de Córdoba, Andalusia, Conde graduated from Córdoba CF's youth academy. He made his senior debut with the reserves in the 2006–07 season, in Tercera División.

Conde played his first match as a professional on 3 September 2008, coming on as a substitute for Pepe Díaz in the 82nd minute of a 2–1 away loss against CD Tenerife in the second round of the Copa del Rey. He would spend most of his spell with the B side, always in the lower leagues.

Journeyman
In summer 2009, Conde moved to Atlético Madrid, being assigned to the C team also in the fourth division. He subsequently resumed his career at that level but also in Segunda División B, representing Real Jaén, CD Pozoblanco, Granada CF B, CD Alcoyano, UD Melilla and Mérida AD; he helped the latter team to finish eighth in their first-ever season in the third tier, ranking group top scorer and third overall.

PAS Giannina
On 7 July 2016, aged 28, Conde moved abroad for the first time in his career and signed a three-year contract with PAS Giannina F.C. in the Super League Greece. He scored in only his second appearance in the UEFA Europa League, but in a 1–2 home defeat to AZ Alkmaar in the third qualifying round (1–3 on aggregate).

On 23 October 2016, Conde netted a hat-trick to help the hosts overcome Athlitiki Enosi Larissa F.C. 4–0 at the Zosimades Stadium. He finished the campaign with 14 goals in all competitions, his 13 in the league ranking third. 

Conde netted eight times overall early into 2017–18, which led to interest from Panathinaikos FC. On 10 January 2018, his brace in the second leg of the round of 16 of the Greek Football Cup helped the hosts defeat Levadiakos F.C. 4–0 and go through after a 1–0 loss.

UAE
On 28 August 2018, Conde agreed to a two-year deal at Baniyas Club for a fee of around €800,000. On 15 January 2020, he signed with Shabab Al Ahli Club also in the UAE Pro League.

Return to PAS
Conde returned to PAS Giannina on 9 August 2021, aged 33. He scored in his debut on 12 September, through a free kick in a 1–0 away victory over PAOK FC.

On 18 September 2021, Conde suffered a cruciate ligament rupture in a game against Panathinaikos FC, being sidelined for the rest of the season.

Career statistics

(* UEFA Europa League)

References

External links

1988 births
Living people
Sportspeople from the Province of Córdoba (Spain)
Spanish footballers
Footballers from Andalusia
Association football forwards
Segunda División B players
Tercera División players
Córdoba CF B players
Córdoba CF players
Atlético Madrid C players
Real Jaén footballers
CD Pozoblanco players
Club Recreativo Granada players
CD Alcoyano footballers
UD Melilla footballers
Mérida AD players
Super League Greece players
PAS Giannina F.C. players
UAE Pro League players
Baniyas Club players
Shabab Al-Ahli Club players
Al Dhafra FC players
Spanish expatriate footballers
Expatriate footballers in Greece
Expatriate footballers in the United Arab Emirates
Spanish expatriate sportspeople in Greece
Spanish expatriate sportspeople in the United Arab Emirates